Senator Colburn may refer to:

Richard F. Colburn (born 1950), Maryland State Senate
Waldo Colburn (1824–1885), Massachusetts State Senate